Bostic is a surname. Notable people with the surname include:

Caleb Bostic, American football linebacker 
Earl Bostic (1913–1965), American saxophonist
Jameson Bostic, American boxer
Jason Bostic, American football defensive back
Jeff Bostic, American football player
Jenn Bostic, American Country and Western singer and songwriter
Jim Bostic, American basketball player
Joe Bostic, American football offensive lineman
John Bostic, American football defensive back
Jon Bostic, American football linebacker
Keith Bostic (American football) (born 1961), American football player in the NFL
Keith Bostic (software engineer), American computer programmer
Raphael Bostic (born 1966), American economist

See also
Bostic, North Carolina